Happy Christmas Vol. 3 is a 2000 holiday music compilation album, the third in a series released by BEC Records featuring artists from a variety of styles who were signed to BEC and its parent label, Tooth & Nail Records.

Track listing

References

2000 Christmas albums
Christmas albums by American artists
Happy Christmas albums
Record label compilation albums
2000 compilation albums